High Energy Astrophysics Observatory can refer to:
1st High Energy Astronomy Observatory (HEAO 1)
Einstein Observatory (HEAO 2)
3rd High Energy Astronomy Observatory (HEAO 3) 
HEAO Program

Note that the correct (original) names for these three satellites are "High Energy Astronomy Observatories", not "Astrophysics".